The long-nosed gudgeon (Microphysogobio tungtingensis) is a species of cyprinid fish endemic to China.

References

Microphysogobio
Fish described in 1926